Gérard Roland may refer to:

 Gérard Roland (economist) (born 1954), Belgian economist
 Gérard Roland (footballer) (born 1981), French footballer